Philippe Barca-Cysique (born April 22, 1977, in Paris) is a former French volleyball player who has played 103 games for the national team.

References

FIVB Profile
sports-reference.com

1977 births
Living people
Volleyball players from Paris
Olympic volleyball players of France
Volleyball players at the 2004 Summer Olympics
French people of Guadeloupean descent
Galatasaray S.K. (men's volleyball) players
French men's volleyball players